CPLC Community Schools is an operator of two charter high schools in Tucson, Arizona and one charter high school in Phoenix, AZ. It has some 300 students and 17 faculty members. It is an affiliate of Chicanos Por La Causa.  The current school superintendent of the district is Lori Mejia. As of 2007, CPLC Community Schools has approximately 317 students and approximately 17 faculty members. Hiaki High School were founded in association with the Pascua Yaqui Tribe.

Schools
Toltecalli High School (Arcadia)
Envision High School
Girls Leadership Academy of Arizona

No Longer Operated by CPLC Community Schools 

 Hiaki High School

Defunct
Calli Ollin High School (2010)
Itzcalli Academy (2005)

References

School districts in Pima County, Arizona
Education in Tucson, Arizona
1997 establishments in Arizona
School districts established in 1997